Samuel Dreben (June 1, 1878 – March 15, 1925), sometimes misspelled "Drebben" or "Drebin", and known as "The Fighting Jew", was a highly decorated soldier in the US Army and a mercenary who fought in a variety of wars and revolutions.

Early life
He was born in Poltava, Russian Empire (now Ukraine). With prospects for a Jew in Czarist Russia exceedingly bleak, he ran away twice (once reaching Germany), before emigrating for good at the age of eighteen. He went first to Liverpool, where he worked as a dock hand, then to the United States, arriving in New York City in January 1899.

Military career
Dreben enlisted on June 27, 1899 in the 14th Infantry Regiment and was shipped to the Philippines (acquired by the U.S. as a result of its victory in the Spanish–American War) to help put down a native insurrection led by Emilio Aguinaldo. He quickly distinguished himself in battle. Later, he participated in the rescue of westerners besieged in Beijing during the Boxer Rebellion. Mustered out in 1902, he took a succession of unsatisfactory jobs, including an attempt to fight for the Japanese in the Russo-Japanese War, before reenlisting in 1904. This time, he was stationed at Fort Bliss. It was here that he was trained how to use a machine gun, a skill for which he became well-known (and would need in later years). He made friends in nearby El Paso, Texas before his second army hitch ended in 1907.
 
Together with two other soldiers of fortune and machine gun experts, Tracy Richardson and Emil Lewis Holmdahl, Dreben's wanderings then took him to Central America. He worked as a security guard in the Panama Canal Zone. After several unsuccessful business ventures, he was recruited to fight for various liberation movements or coups such as those in Guatemala, Honduras, Nicaragua, and Mexico. It was in Guatemala that he suffered his only combat wound – a shot in the rear. In the Mexican Revolution, Dreben joined the forces of Francisco Madero as a machine gunner. After Madero's murder in 1913, Dreben worked for Felix A. Sommerfeld in El Paso, smuggled arms to Pancho Villa's forces, and went on sabotage missions in Mexico for Sommerfeld's secret service. When the latter made his infamous raid on Columbus, New Mexico on March 9, 1916, killing some civilians, Dreben joined the Punitive Expedition sent by an outraged America to bring his former comrade-in-arms to justice. Dreben served as a scout and became good friends with the expedition's commander, General John Pershing. The Americans were never able to catch the elusive Villa, and the fiasco eventually came to an end in 1917.

In early 1917, Dreben (then 39) married 19-year-old Helen Spence. They soon had a baby daughter. However, America's entry into World War I eventually lured him back into the Army, enlisting in the 141st Infantry Regiment of the 36th Infantry Division. En route to the fighting in France, he received word that his child had died.

Dreben once again distinguished himself in combat. For his bravery at St. Etienne in October 1918, Sergeant Dreben was awarded the Distinguished Service Cross, the Croix de guerre and the Médaille militaire. General Pershing, now commander of the American Expeditionary Force, called him "the finest soldier and one of the bravest men I ever knew."

Post-war life
After the end of the war, Dreben returned to El Paso, where he divorced his wife because of her infidelity in his absence. The war hero then settled down and started a successful insurance business.

In 1921, Dreben received another honor; he was selected by General Pershing to be one of the honorary pallbearers (along with another World War I hero, Alvin York) for the burial of the Unknown Soldier at Arlington National Cemetery on November 11.

In the same year, Dreben and some others were recruited by El Paso police to illegally extradite an escaped prisoner, Phil Alguin, who had murdered Los Angeles Police Detective Sergeant John J. Fitzgerald.  The men set up a false medical office in Ciudad Juárez, Mexico advertising the removal of tattoos.  The plan was that when Alguin came in for treatment, they would apply anesthetic, then drive him to El Paso.  However, Alguin was not rendered fully unconscious and was able to cry for help.  Dreben and the others were arrested, but were released from prison after three days due to pressure from the United States.

In 1923, he married for the second time, this time to Meade Andrews. She convinced him to move to California for a fresh start.

On March 15, 1925, Dreben died when a nurse accidentally injected him with the wrong substance. Newspapers all over the country, including the New York Times and the El Paso Times, paid tribute to him. Famed columnist Damon Runyon wrote a eulogy, and the Texas legislature adjourned for a day in his honor. He is buried in Glendale, California's Grand View Memorial Park Cemetery.

Dreben is played by Alan Arkin in And Starring Pancho Villa as Himself.

References

External links

biography at jewish-history.com

Additional information
Art Leibson, Sam Dreben: The Fighting Jew, Tucson, Arizona : Westernlore Press, 1996
Martin Zielonka, "The Fighting Jew", Publications of the American Jewish Historical Society 31 (1928), 211–217
"Hero of Many Wars Has Quit", The Los Angeles Times, July 11, 1920, p. V4
"True Soldier of Fortune", The Los Angeles Times, Oct. 4, 1922, p. 13
"Sam Dreben is Angeleno Now", The Los Angeles Times, July 18, 1923, p. II8

"Taps Today for Soldier of Fortune", The Los Angeles Times, March 16, 1925, p. A1
"Sam Dreben Death Suit Dismissed", Los Angeles Times, May 13, 1926, p. A23
Herman Archer, "Famous Soldiers of Fortune", Chicago Daily Tribune, Aug 28, 1927, p. S2
Heribert von Feilitzsch, 'Felix A. Sommerfeld: Spymaster in Mexico, 1908 to 1914 Henselstone Verlag LLC, Amissville, Virginia, 2012

1878 births
1925 deaths
United States Army personnel of World War I
American mercenaries
United States Army soldiers
Recipients of the Distinguished Service Cross (United States)
Recipients of the Croix de Guerre 1914–1918 (France)
Recipients of the Médaille militaire (France)
Jewish American military personnel
People from Poltava
Burials at Grand View Memorial Park Cemetery